SYR3: Invito al ĉielo is an album by American alternative rock band Sonic Youth. It was released on March 2, 1998, and was the third in a series of experimental releases issued on the band's own SYR label. SYR3 marked the beginning of the band's collaborations with producer and musician Jim O'Rourke; his continuing work with the group after SYR3 resulted in O'Rourke becoming an official member of Sonic Youth by 2002's Murray Street.

Background 

SYR3 followed the band's tradition of having the liner notes for SYR releases written in foreign languages, in this case, using Esperanto. "Invito al ĉielo" translates to "An Invitation to Heaven". However, the words that Kim Gordon sang were in English.

Track listing

Personnel 
Sonic Youth
 Thurston Moore – vocals, guitar 
 Kim Gordon – vocals, bass
 Lee Ranaldo – vocals, guitar 
 Steve Shelley – drums 
Jim O'Rourke – bass

Technical
 Wharton Tiers – engineering
 Greg Calbi – mastering
 KPG (Kevin Gray) – mastering

References

External links 
 
 

1998 EPs
Sonic Youth EPs
Sonic Youth Recordings albums